Adam Powell (born 1 January 1987, in Romford) is a rugby union footballer who plays at inside centre for Newcastle Falcons in the Aviva Premiership after transferring from Saracens in 2013.

Powell was called up to the England Saxons in June 2008 to play in the 2008 Churchill Cup. He was called up again in January 2009 and scored a try against .

References

External links
Newcastle Falcons Profile
Saracens Profile
England Profile

1987 births
Living people
Saracens F.C. players
Rugby union centres
Rugby union players from Romford